"Look Through My Eyes" is a song by English recording artist Phil Collins from the Brother Bear film soundtrack. It was recorded by Everlife for the Bridge to Terabithia soundtrack and the Disneymania 4 album. The song was the film's first single.

Critical reception
Allmusic described the song as a "future American Idol standard...devoid of craftsmanship", adding it "positively radiate[s] Hollywood gloss — it's simply indicative of pop culture's voracious appetite for audio fast food". Commonsensemedia noted that Brother Bear songs like Look Through My Eyes "could prop the soundtrack of any number of movies about a young boy's self-discovery" due to not specifically evoking Inuit culture.

Track listing
"Look Through My Eyes" – 4:00
"Look Through My Eyes" (Instrumental) – 4:00

Personnel
 Phil Collins – vocals, drums, arrangements 
 Jamie Muhoberac – keyboards 
 Carmen Rizzo – programming 
 Dan Chase – programming
 Tim Pierce – guitars 
 Paul Bushnell – bass 
 Rob Cavallo – arrangements
 David Campbell – string arrangements and conductor

Charts

Weekly charts

Year-end charts

References

2003 singles
2003 songs
Phil Collins songs
Brother Bear
Disney songs
Songs written for animated films
Song recordings produced by Phil Collins
Song recordings produced by Rob Cavallo
Walt Disney Records singles